Fintar o Destino (formerly written as Fintar o destino, Not Heading into Destiny) is a 1998 Cape Verdean-Portuguese sports film directed by Portuguese director Fernando Vendrell. The movie features Carlos Germano, Betina Lopes and Paulo Miranda.

Plot
The 50-year-old guy Mané who was a resident of Mindelo on the island of São Vicente as a pubkeeper and a youth football (soccer) trainer. He is reminded each day as he was once as a successful goalkeeper.  The old admiration for him is steadily disappearing. He is therefore not gaining his opportunity to switch to S.L. Benfica, the young Kalu in the team trained for his talent in which he wanted him to compete for Benfica. Against the will of his wife, he later made his trip to Lisbon. Not he wanted to see his bestranged son but for the club Benfica on the occasion of the finals match and for a chance for Kalu to participate.  He also urged him to find a sportsman, who then, unlike him decides to change to Benfica. Afterwards he returned to his home island of São Vicente sobered.

Cast
 Carlos Germano - Mané
 Betina Lopes - Lucy
 Paulo Miranda - Kalu
 Manuel Estevão - Djack
 Figueira Cid - Joaquim
 Daniel Martinho - Alberto
 Rita Loureiro - Julia
 Diogo Dória
 Rui Águas (guest appearance)
 António Veloso (guest appearance)

Reception
The film received moderate reviews from directors that related to Lusophony Africa. The focus of the film was not on the problem on an area but its characters and different views and expectations of life, their enthusiasm on football.

The film won several awards, including a nomination in the panoramic section at the 1998 Berlin International Film Festival (also the Berlinale) and a Jury Award at the Fantasporto Film Festival.

See also
Cinema of Cape Verde
List of Portuguese films of the 1990s

References

External links
 

1998 films
Cape Verdean drama films
Portuguese drama films
Films set in Cape Verde
Culture of São Vicente, Cape Verde
Films set in Lisbon
1990s sports films
1990s Portuguese-language films